Carex deflexa, the northern sedge, is a cespitose sedge with purplish brown to reddish brown rhizomes and pale green leafs that are often shorter than stems and 0.9–2.6 mm wide.

It is native to Canada, most of the US except the central states, and Greenland.

Reference 

deflexa
Flora of North America
Flora of Greenland
Plants described in 1824